The Victoria Cross (VC) is a military decoration bestowed on members of the British or Commonwealth armed forces for acts of valour or gallantry performed in the face of the enemy. In the British honours system and those of many Commonwealth nations it is the highest award a soldier can receive for actions in combat. It was established in 1856 and since then has been awarded 1,356 times, including to three recipients who were awarded the VC twice.

The British Army's Brigade of Gurkhas, units composed of Nepalese soldiers—although originally led by British officers—has been a part of the army since 1815. When raised, it originally focused on conflicts in the Far East, but the transfer of Hong Kong from British to Chinese hands necessitated that the brigade move its base to the UK. A battalion is still maintained in Brunei and as at 2016, units serve in Afghanistan.

Since the VC was introduced it has been awarded to Gurkhas or British officers serving with Gurkha regiments 26 times. The first award was made in 1858 to a British officer of the Gurkhas, John Tytler, during the campaigns that followed the Indian Rebellion of 1857. The first award to a native Gurkha, Kulbir Thapa, was in 1915 during the First World War. When the Victoria Cross was initially established, Gurkhas, along with all other native troops of the British East India Company Army or the British Indian Army, were not eligible for the decoration and as such, until 1911, all of the Gurkha recipients of the award were British officers who were attached to Gurkha regiments. Until that time the highest award that Gurkhas were eligible for was the Indian Order of Merit. Since 1911 however, of the 16 VCs awarded to men serving with Gurkha regiments, 13 have been bestowed on native Gurkhas. The most recent award was made in 1965 to Rambahadur Limbu, during the Indonesia–Malaysia confrontation. Along with the Royal Green Jackets, the Gurkha regiments are among the most heavily decorated Commonwealth units.

In 1950, when India became a republic, Gurkhas serving in the Gurkha regiments of the Indian Army lost their eligibility for the Victoria Cross and they are now covered under the Indian honours system. Under this system the Param Vir Chakra (PVC), which is India's highest military decoration for valour, is considered to be equivalent to the Victoria Cross. As such only those serving in the Gurkha units of the British Army remain eligible for the Victoria Cross.

Two George Cross (GC) medals have been awarded to Gurkha soldiers for acts of bravery displayed not in combat. The George Cross (GC) is the highest award bestowed by the British government for non-operational gallantry or gallantry not in the presence of an enemy. In the UK honours system, the George Cross is equal in stature to the Victoria Cross. This has been the case since the introduction of the George Cross in 1940.

Recipients

Notes

References

Sources

External links
 UK Ministry of Defence website: Details of the Gurkha Brigade

.
Gurkhas
Brigade of Gurkhas recipients of the Victoria Cross
Brigade of Gurkhas recipients of the Victoria Cross
.
.